In enzymology, a taurocyamine kinase is an enzyme that catalyzes the chemical reaction

ATP + taurocyamine  ADP + N-phosphotaurocyamine

Thus, the two substrates of this enzyme are ATP and taurocyamine, whereas its two products are ADP and N-phosphotaurocyamine.

This enzyme belongs to the family of transferases, specifically those transferring phosphorus-containing groups (phosphotransferases) with a nitrogenous group as acceptor.  The systematic name of this enzyme class is ATP:taurocyamine N-phosphotransferase. Other names in common use include taurocyamine phosphotransferase, and ATP:taurocyamine phosphotransferase.  This enzyme participates in taurine and hypotaurine metabolism.

References

 
 
 
 

EC 2.7.3
Enzymes of unknown structure